Barbamouche, or Barbemouche ("Barbary fly"), is the warhorse of Climborin, one of the Saracens in the French epic, The Song of Roland. Barbamouche is mentioned in laisse 116 of the poem.

References

Matter of France
Individual warhorses
Fictional horses